Hail to the Sunrise is the name of a monument in Charlemont, Massachusetts. The monument features a prominent statue of a Mohawk Indian and a reflecting pool. Completed in 1932, it is a major feature of Mohawk Park, a roadside park located beside Massachusetts Route 2, the Mohawk Trail.

The bronze statue depicts a Native American man in traditional wardrobe looking eastward with his arms extended. He faces the direction of the rising sun and is said to be greeting the Great Spirit.  The casting stands upon a large boulder. A tablet in the shape of an arrowhead at the base of the statue reads: "Hail to the Sunrise - In Memory of the Mohawk Indian."  The pool is lined with 100 inscribed stones from various tribes and councils of the Improved Order of Red Men (a fraternal organization of white men) from throughout the United States.

History
The statue was created by sculptor Joseph Pollia and revealed on October 1, 1932.  More than 2,000 people attended the ceremony.  The monument honors the peoples of the five Mohawk Nations that inhabited western Massachusetts and New York State.  The Mohawks that traveled this trail were said to be friendly to white settlers.

Today the monument serves as a reminder of the area's Native American heritage.  The grounds are open to the public and many travelers find this to be a welcoming stop along the scenic highway.

The park also serves as the site of an annual parade and ceremony hosted by the Improved Order of Red Men each September.

See also
 Appeal to the Great Spirit, 1909 statue

References

External links
 Berkshireweb.com: Mohawk Trail
 Scenicusa.net: Mohawk Trail

Statues in Massachusetts
Mohawk culture
Sculptures of Native Americans
Outdoor sculptures in Massachusetts
Bronze sculptures in Massachusetts
Native American history of Massachusetts
History of Berkshire County, Massachusetts
1932 sculptures
1932 establishments in Massachusetts
Sculptures of men in Massachusetts
Improved Order of Red Men